Wong khrueang sai (literally "string ensemble") is a musical ensemble in Thai classical music which consists primarily of string instruments. A typical khrueang sai ensemble features two two-string fiddles, one high and one low (saw duang and saw u), a three-string zither called jakhe, a vertical duct flute called khlui, hand drums, and various cymbals. Depending on the size of the ensemble, instruments may be doubled or left out.  A three-string spike fiddle called saw sam sai may be added as well. The khim (hammered dulcimer) has become popular and is also used in this ensemble. In the 20th century, Western instruments such as the violin or organ have also occasionally been integrated into khrueang sai ensembles.

Playing context
The khrueang sai is one of the quietest and most intimate ensembles in Thai classical music.  It is used to accompany singing, dances, and holidays. It also used in impromptu occasions requiring music.

Varieties
The following are some of the ensemble types, depending on the occasion:

Khrueang sai wong lek
Khrueang sai khrueang khu
Khrueang sai pi chawa
Khrueang sai prasom 

Here is the definition of the khrueang sai according to the NIU South East Asia Studies department:

Sound clips are available at the website above for all Thai ensembles.

Types of wong khrueang sai

Khrueang sai diao
Wong khrueang sai diao is an ensemble consisting of one each of the following instruments:

ching - timekeeper of ensemble
saw duang
saw u
khlui
thon and rammana - secondary timekeeper
jakhe

This kind of ensemble is used when there is limit of space. It is also called wong khrueang sai wong lek or wong khrueang sai khurang diao (วงเครื่องสายเครื่องเดี่ยว).

Khrueang sai khu
Wong khrueang sai khu is an ensemble consisting of instruments as described in the khrueang sai diao ensemble, but double in number (except ching, thon, and rammana). It is also called wong khrueang sai wong yai (วงเครื่องสายวงใหญ่).

Khrueang sai prasom
Wong khrueang sai prasom is an ensemble arranged by mixing khrueang sai diao or khrueang sai khu with other instruments, such as organ, ranad ek, khim and also mixed with the piphat ensemble to create new ensemble called khrueang sai prasom piphat (เครื่องสายประสมปี่พาทย์).

Khrueang sai pi chawa
Wong khrueang sai pi chawa is an ensemble arranged by adding pi chawa (ปี่ชวา), glong khaek (กลองแขก), and krap (กรับ) to the wong khrueang sai diao. It is usually played in funeral ceremonies.

See also
Piphat
Mahori
Music of Thailand

References
 Information about wong khrueang sai (Thai)
 How to arrange Thai emsemble (Thai)

Thai music
Classical and art music traditions